Matthew Prozialeck (born September 3, 1989), also known as Matt Charles and Matt Prozialeck is an American blues harmonica player. He is best known for being a member of Erin Harpe & the Delta Swingers and also for his solo and session work. He has performed with many different blues artists and has appeared on several charting releases.

Background
Matthew Prozialeck was born in Philadelphia, Pennsylvania. He is the son of Scientist Walter Prozialeck. He grew up in Naperville, west of Chicago, Illinois. He graduated from Naperville North High School in 2008 and was a member of the 2007 8A state champion varsity football team. He graduated from Northern Illinois University in 2013 with a degree in Graphic design. He played trumpet as a child but never played the harmonica until he lived in the college art dormitory. While at school he was inspired by Paul Butterfield, Howlin Wolf, Little Walter, and Charlie Musselwhite to learn the harmonica.  He then began to study Chicago blues and jam in clubs in Chicago.

Career

Early career
He started playing professionally in college. He learned to play the harmonica and played around the local blues scene for years. He was a member of The Ed Burns Rhythm & Blues Revue for most of 2014. During that time he began using his middle name Charles going by Matt or Matthew Charles due to the difficulty some have pronouncing his last name. In 2015, Prozialeck relocated to Boston, Massachusetts join the Vizztone band, Erin Harpe & the Delta Swingers. The Delta Swingers toured nationally and were semifinalists in the International Blues Challenge in 2017. At the age of 27 he was the second youngest harmonica player in the competition and the youngest to reach the semifinals that year. His first album with the Delta Swingers, Big Road, was released on Vizztone in October 2017 to positive reviews. In a review of the album by Daniel Pavlica of The Rocktologist, his playing was recognized and the reviewer said he "played with poignancy and lusty confidence". Big Road peaked at number 9 on the Roots Music Report Blues Albums Chart and was ranked number 52 on their best of 2018 list. <ref>Positively Naperville, Friday, November 10, 2017 - ‘Harmonica man’ from Naperville is playing blues big time in Boston</ref>  A 2018 article in Blues Blast Magazine described Prozialeck as the band's "secret weapon". In 2017, he became an official endorser for Seydel harmonicas. The Delta Swingers were nominated for a Boston Music Award and three New England Music Awards in 2018. The band opened for Roomful Of Blues, Lil' Ed Williams, James Montgomery and Jason Ricci during his tenure. He appeared on their album The Christmas Swing which would be his last release with the band in December 2018.

Solo career
In January 2019, he left Erin Harpe & the Delta Swingers to record and focus on solo and session work. He moved to New Bedford, Massachusetts shortly afterward. In May 2018, he played on a couple songs for the sessions for GA-20's debut album, Lonely Soul, which was released in October 2019 on Karma Chef Records and peaked at number 2 on the Billboard'' Blues Chart. He also appeared on the "GA-20 with Charlie Musselwhite and Luther Dickinson"' 7 inch single, playing harp on the B-side "Sit Down Baby" and singing backup on the A-side, "Naggin' On My Mind". In October 2019 he co-founded the Boston based blues band The Wandering Ones. The Wandering Ones' first release appeared on The Rum Bar Records compilation Rebel Rousers.

Discography

Albums

Solo Singles

Singles as sideman

References

1989 births
Living people
American blues harmonica players
American blues singers
Musicians from Illinois
Musicians from Philadelphia
Northern Illinois University alumni
People from Naperville, Illinois